Urus-Martanovsky District (Ẋalxa-Martanan khoşt) is an administrative and municipal district (raion), one of the fifteen in the Chechen Republic, Russia. It is located in the center of the republic. Its administrative center is the town of Urus-Martan. Population:  61,181 (2002 Census);  The population of Urus-Martan accounts for 40.7% of the district's total population.

References

Notes

Sources

Districts of Chechnya